The Lechitic (or Lekhitic) languages are a language subgroup consisting of Polish and several other languages and dialects that were once spoken in the area that is now Poland and eastern Germany. It is one of the branches of the larger West Slavic subgroup; the other branches of this subgroup are the Czech–Slovak languages and the Sorbian languages.

Languages

The Lechitic languages are:
 Polish, used by approximately 38 million native speakers in Poland and several million elsewhere. Polish is considered to have several dialects, including Greater Polish, Lesser Polish and Masovian, among others;
 Silesian, used today by over 530,000 people (2011 census) in Polish Silesia and by some more in Czech Silesia. The different varieties of Silesian are often considered to be dialects of Polish and Czech, and are sometimes seen as forming a distinct language;
 Pomeranian, spoken by Slavic Pomeranians, of which the only remaining variety is:
 Kashubian, used today by over 110,000 people (2011 census) in the eastern part of Pomerania. Sometimes it is considered a dialect of Polish;
 Polabian, extinct since the mid-18th century, a language formerly spoken by Slavic peoples in areas around the Elbe river in what is now the northeast of Germany.

Features
Characteristics of Lechitic languages include:
 Change of the so-called liquid diphthong in the TorT group (where T is any consonant) variously into either TroT or TarT (see also: Slavic liquid metathesis and pleophony)
 Retention of *dz as an affricate, rather than a plain fricative z, both when inherited from Proto-Slavic from the result of the second Slavic palatalization, as well as when it came from Proto-Slavic *ď. Compare Polish , Czech  and Slovak  ("money"). Slovak preserves dz when coming from PS *ď, but has z in the former case.
 Lack of the g → ɣ transition. Compare Polish , Czech  ("mountain").
 Preservation of nasal vowels.
 Depalatalization of Proto-Slavic *ě, *ę into a, ǫ before hard (unpalatalized) dental consonants. This gives rise to alternations such as modern Polish  ("summer", nominative) vs.  (locative). In Polish this change was later obscured by the merger of ę and ǫ into one nasal ą, but it is still visible in Kashubian, e.g.
 Depalatalization of (Late) Proto-Slavic syllabic sonorants *ŕ̥ *ĺ̥ in the same positions as the above change. This is shared with the Sorbian languages.
 Vocalization of (Late) Proto-Slavic syllabic sonorants *r̥ *l̥ *ŕ̥ *ĺ̥.

Sample text
The following is the Lord's Prayer in several of the Lechitic languages:

Etymology
The term Lechitic is applied both to the languages of this group and to Slavic peoples speaking these languages (known as Lechites). The term is related to the name of the legendary Polish forefather Lech and the name Lechia by which Poland was formerly sometimes known. For more details, see Lechites.

See also
 Lech, Čech, and Rus

Notes